The Virginia Peninsula is a peninsula in southeast Virginia, bounded by the York River, James River, Hampton Roads and Chesapeake Bay.  It is sometimes known as the Lower Peninsula to distinguish it from two other peninsulas to the north, the Middle Peninsula and the Northern Neck.

It is the site of historic Jamestown, founded in 1607 as the first English settlement in North America. Geographically located at the northwestern reaches, Charles City and New Kent counties are part of the Virginia Peninsula. In the 21st century, they are also considered part of the Richmond–Petersburg region. The rest of the Virginia Peninsula is all part of the Virginia Beach–Norfolk–Newport News, VA–NC MSA (metropolitan statistical area) with a population of about 1.8 million. The Hampton Roads MSA is the common name for the metropolitan area that surrounds the body of water of the same name. It is the seventh-largest metropolitan area in the Southeast and the 32nd largest in the United States.

The land portion of Hampton Roads has been historically divided into two regions, the Virginia Peninsula or Peninsula on the north side, and South Hampton Roads on the south side. (Locally, South Hampton Roads is commonly called "the Southside", but this is not to be confused with "Southside Virginia", a separate region of the south central portion of Virginia located farther inland.) More recently, the boundaries of the Hampton Roads metropolitan area have expanded to include the two southernmost counties of the Middle Peninsula, across the York River from the Virginia Peninsula.

History

Spanish exploration 
Early in the 16th century, Spanish explorers were the first Europeans to see the Chesapeake Bay, which they called Bahía de Madre de Dios or Bahía de Santa Maria. They were searching for the Northwest Passage to India and the Orient.  They named the land now known as Virginia, as Ajacán.

The Spanish succeeded in founding a colonial settlement in the New World in 1565 at St. Augustine, Florida. It was the first founded by Europeans in what is now the United States.  They established small Spanish outposts along the eastern coast into present-day Georgia and the Carolinas.  The northernmost post was Santa Elena (today Port Royal, South Carolina). From there Juan Pardo was commissioned to lead expeditions into the interior, founding Fort San Juan in 1567–1568 at the regional Mississippian culture chiefdom of Joara. Located in present-day western North Carolina, this was the first European settlement in the interior of North America.

English settlement 
The first permanent English settlement in North America was established in 1607 at Jamestown. The first continuously occupied settlement was at Kecoughtan in Elizabeth City County what is now the City of Hampton. Nearby, Fort Monroe, the country's oldest military base still in use, is located at Old Point Comfort. Old Point Comfort is also the site of the first landing of Africans in America, in 1619. After declaring independence from Great Britain, Virginia's first state capital was Williamsburg. Also, the decisive battle of the American Revolution, the siege of Yorktown in 1781, took place on the Virginia Peninsula.

American Civil War 
During the American Civil War (1861–1865), the Union Army invaded the Virginia Peninsula as part of the Peninsula Campaign in 1862 to capture Richmond, beginning from Fort Monroe at the entrance to Hampton Roads, which had remained in Union control after Virginia seceded in 1861. At the outset of the Peninsula Campaign, the Battle of Hampton Roads between the first ironclad warships took place near the mouth of the James River off the eastern tip of Warwick County. The 1862 Siege of Yorktown took place along the York River. Finally, after a lengthy standoff, the largest Union Army of the war under General George B. McClellan chased the retreating Confederates through the Williamsburg Line and westward literally to the "Gates of Richmond", where the swampy upper reaches of the Chickahominy River created a natural barrier behind which the defenders successfully held the Confederate capital, essentially prolonging the war for three more devastating years.

Post-war 
As the region and Virginia rebuilt during Reconstruction, the Chesapeake and Ohio Railway (C&O) under the leadership of Collis P. Huntington was completed from Richmond to the Ohio River by 1871. Long a dream of Virginians, and later sponsored by both Virginia and West Virginia, the new railroad opened paths to ship products west, as well as offering an economically viable method of shipping the rich bituminous coal of the region to fuel the Industrial Revolution. However, the tidal portion of the James River, while navigable from Hampton Roads to the Fall Line at Richmond, couldn't accommodate the deep drafts of collier ships.

The Peninsula had been long without a railroad, which had been newly developing technology beginning in the 1830s. In 1881, the Peninsula Extension of the C&O was built from Richmond through Williamsburg to Newport News Point. There, Collis Huntington, his associates, and his Old Dominion Land Company developed his vision for the area. Within only 15 years, a rural farm community in Warwick County turned into the new independent city of Newport News, Virginia, by 1896 as new coal piers brought ships to what would become the world's largest shipyard, Newport News Shipbuilding and Drydock Company. Hotels, houses, schools and businesses sprung up there, and at many points along the new rail line in Warwick, York and James City counties. Oyster Point became a shipping place for the watermen and the new town of Lee Hall, Virginia, emerged, and became an important point due to its proximity to Yorktown and later to the new military base which became the U.S. Army's Fort Eustis. In Elizabeth City County, tracks were extended from Newport News to reach Old Point Comfort, where resort hotels and Buckroe Beach were developed. There, a new town was incorporated. Phoebus was named after one of its early leading citizens, Harrison Phoebus.

20th century 
In James City County, Toano became a major shipping point for the area's truck farming and an entire new development planned by a C&O land agent to attract farmers of Scandinavian descent from the colder regions of the American Mid-West emerged at Norge shortly after the start of the 20th century. Later in the first half of the 20th century, especially during the two world wars, massive military facilities were established on large reservations which today contain Langley Air Force Base, Fort Eustis, Naval Weapons Station Yorktown, and Camp Peary. To make way, all of Mulberry Island and entire communities including Lackey, Halstead's Point, Penniman, Bigler's Mill, and Magruder disappeared in the process. However, many of the displaced Virginians chose to relocate to Grove in James City County and other areas close by on the Peninsula.

After the capital of Virginia moved to Richmond in 1780 for greater security   during the American Revolutionary War, Williamsburg became much less busy. By the early 20th century, it was described as a "sleepy little hamlet", known best for the College of William and Mary and Eastern State Hospital, which was the successor to the country's first mental hospital, as well as its fading memories and deteriorating colonial sites. All that changed dramatically beginning in 1926. The restoration and recreation of Colonial Williamsburg, one of the largest historic restorations ever undertaken, was championed by the Reverend Dr. W.A.R. Goodwin and the patriarch of the Rockefeller family, John D. Rockefeller, Jr., along with the active participation of his wife, Abby Aldrich Rockefeller, who wanted to celebrate the patriots and the early history of the United States. The restoration of the colonial capital, construction of the Colonial Parkway by the U.S. National Park Service, several major enhancements at Jamestown and Yorktown, and development of several theme parks such as Busch Gardens Williamsburg beginning in the 1970s, all combined to help make the Historic Triangle area of Colonial Virginia become one of the most popular tourist destinations in the United States by the end of the 20th century.

Local government 
In Colonial times, and even in the first 150 years of the United States, much like Virginia as a whole, the Virginia Peninsula was in an almost constant state of change in terms of local government, largely due to growth, as counties were divided and towns were formed as the population grew. Some towns grew to become cities. Under the state constitutional changes in 1871, extant and future cities in Virginia became independent cities of the counties they had formerly been located within.

However, in the second half of the 20th century, an unprecedented wave of city-county-town local government consolidations took place in South Hampton Roads and on the Virginia Peninsula. Nowhere else in Virginia have rural areas and more dense cities been combined in such a manner as these two areas. The changes resulted in the two areas having Virginia's cities with the largest land areas and the most farming, even over 30 years after the consolidations in some instances.

Newport News–Hampton Metropolitan Area (1960–1983) 
In 1960, the "Newport News–Hampton Metropolitan Statistical Area" was designated a metropolitan area by the U.S. Census Bureau. It comprised the cities of Newport News, Hampton and York County.

In 1983, the MSA, comprising the cities of Newport News, Hampton, Poquoson and Williamsburg, and the counties of Gloucester, James City and York, was combined with the Norfolk–Virginia Beach–Portsmouth MSA and renamed the "Norfolk–Virginia Beach–Newport News MSA".

Current political subdivisions 
The Virginia Peninsula subregion includes four independent cities (Hampton, Newport News, Poquoson and Williamsburg) and two counties (James City County and York County). There are currently no incorporated towns. There were also a number of political subdivisions which are now extinct, primarily due to both growth of communities and consolidation of local government (see section below).

Defunct political subdivisions 
Many incorporated (formally constituted) localities have become legally void, though most have not been abandoned by their citizens, with the notable exception of Jamestown. Exclusive of towns which became cities and still have the same name, no less than 4 shires, 2 counties, 4 towns, and 1 city no longer exist in the Virginia Peninsula area under their earlier names.

The following is a listing of these 11 extinct shire, counties, towns, and cities, with the approximate dates they existed:
 Jamestown, Virginia (1607) largely abandoned as a Town after 1699
 Kecoughtan, Virginia (1610), became part of Town and City of Hampton
 Middle Plantation (1632), became Williamsburg after 1699
 Elizabeth River Shire (1634–1643)
 Warwick River Shire (1634–1643)
 Charles River Shire (1634–1643)
 James City Shire (1634–1643)
 Elizabeth City County (1643–1952), now part of the city of Hampton.
 Warwick County (aka Warwick River County) (1643–1952), now part of the city of Newport News
 Town of Phoebus (1900–1952) (earlier known as unincorporated towns of Millwood, Roseland Farms, Chesapeake City), became part of city of Hampton
 City of Warwick (1952–1958), became part of city of Newport News

Major bridges, bridge tunnels, ferry system 

Generally surrounded by water, the Virginia Peninsula is linked to other areas across the surrounding water barriers of the James and York Rivers, and the harbor of Hampton Roads by 2 bridge–tunnels, 2 large drawbridges, and a state-operated ferry system. These are:
 Hampton Roads Bridge–Tunnel
 Monitor–Merrimac Memorial Bridge–Tunnel
 James River Bridge
 George P. Coleman Memorial Bridge
 Jamestown Ferry

Interstate Highways 
 Interstate 64
 Interstate 664
 Hampton Roads Beltway

U.S. and State Routes 
 U.S. Route 17
 U.S. Route 60
 U.S. Route 258
 State Route 5
 State Route 31
 State Route 32
 State Route 134
 State Route 143
 State Route 199 (Humelsine Parkway)

Scenic parkways and trails 
 Colonial Parkway
 Virginia Capital Trail

U.S. military installations 

The Virginia Peninsula is home to several military bases.

City of Hampton 
Langley Air Force Base is located in Hampton. Fort Monroe had been the oldest installation in the region, but closed in September, 2011. The now-decommissioned Fort Wool, located on a man made island called Rip Raps across the mouth of Hampton Roads from Fort Monroe, is also in Hampton.

City of Newport News 
Fort Eustis, home of the U.S. Army Training and Doctrine Command (TRADOC) is in Newport News. A major military contractor, Newport News Shipbuilding, is also in the city.

York County 
York County is home to the U.S. Navy's Yorktown Naval Weapons Station and a supply depot at nearby Cheatham Annex. Camp Peary and Coast Guard Training Center Yorkown are also located in York County.

James City County 
Although each is primarily located in other jurisdictions, portions of Fort Eustis, Naval Weapons Station Yorktown, Cheatham Annex, and Camp Peary extend into James City County.

See also 
 Historic Triangle
 Colonial Williamsburg
 Jamestown Festival Park (1957–present)
 Battle of Hampton Roads
 Jamestown Exposition (1907)
 Mariners' Museum
 Chesapeake and Ohio Railway (C&O)
 Peninsula Extension (of the C&O to Newport News)
 College of William & Mary

References

Sources 
 
 
 

Landforms of Hampton, Virginia
Landforms of James City County, Virginia
Peninsulas of Virginia
Landforms of Poquoson, Virginia
Landforms of Williamsburg, Virginia
Landforms of York County, Virginia
Landforms of Newport News, Virginia
Hampton Roads